Casparsson is a Swedish surname. Notable people with the surname include:

Anna Casparsson (1861–1961), Swedish textile artist
Ernst Casparsson (1886–1973), Swedish equestrian 
Peter Casparsson (born 1975), Swedish ice hockey defenceman

Swedish-language surnames